Shaucha literally means purity, cleanliness and clearness. It refers to purity of mind, speech and body. Saucha is one of the Niyamas of Yoga. It is discussed in many ancient Indian texts such as the Mahabharata and Patanjali's Yoga Sutras. It is a virtue in Hinduism and Jainism. In Hinduism purity is a part of worship, an attitude or purity of mind an important quality for salvation. Purity is a mind pure and free of evil thoughts and behaviors.

Saucha includes outer purity of body as well as inner purity of mind. The concept of Saucha is synonymous with Shuddhi (शुद्धि). LePage states that Saucha in yoga is on many levels, and deepens as an understanding and evolution of self increases.

Shaucha, or holistic purity of the body, is considered essential for health, happiness and general well-being. External purity is achieved through daily ablutions, while internal purity is cultivated through physical exercises, including asana (postures) and pranayama (breathing techniques). Along with daily ablutions to cleanse one's body, the concept of Shaucha suggests clean surrounding, along with fresh and clean food to purify the body. Lack of Saucha, such as letting toxins build in body are a source of impurity.

Shaucha goes beyond purity of body, and includes purity of speech and mind. Anger, hate, prejudice, greed, lust, pride, fear, negative thoughts are a source of impurity of mind. The impurities of the intellect are cleansed through the process of self-examination, or knowledge of self (Adhyatma-Vidya). The mind is purified through mindfulness and meditation on one's intent, feelings, actions and its causes. 

Teachers of the Vedanta path of yoga prepare to have holy thoughts and for performing holy actions. Students and the young help teachers prepare for worship, building self-control and selflessness. This is to offer a true gift - to offer something without expecting anything in return. Sarada Devi said "Pure mind begets ecstatic love (prema-bhakti)."

Literature

Saucha is included as one of five Niyamas in Yoga, that is activity that is recommended for spiritual development of an individual. Verse II.32 of Yogasutra lists the five niyamas. In verse II.40, Patanjali describes outer purity, while verse II.41 discusses inner purity, as follows:

Saucha is one of the ten Yamas listed by Śāṇḍilya Upanishad, as well as by Svātmārāma. It is one of the virtuous restraints (yamas) taught in ancient Indian texts. The other nine yamas are Ahiṃsā (अहिंसा): Nonviolence, Satya (सत्य): truthfulness, Asteya (अस्तेय): not stealing, Brahmacharya (ब्रह्मचर्य): celibacy chastity and fidelity, Kṣamā (क्षमा): forgiveness, Dhṛti (धृति): fortitude, Dayā (दया): compassion, Ārjava (आर्जव): sincerity and non-hypocrisy, and Mitahara (मितहार): moderate diet.

The Epic Mahabharata mentions the virtue of purity (Saucha) in numerous books. For example, in Book 14 Chapter 38, it lists Saucha as a high quality found in the liberated, happy and dharmic person,

Bhagavad Gita describes purity at three levels in Book 17, verses 14-16, namely body, speech and thoughts. Purity of body comes from cleanliness of body as well as from what one eats and drinks. Purity of speech comes from being truthful and through use of words that are not injurious, hurtful or distressing to others or self. Purity of thoughts comes from reflection, peace of mind, silence, calmness, gentleness and purity of being.

Purity of mind, speech and body has been one of the important virtues in Indian philosophy.

See also
Ahiṃsā
Satya
Asteya
Brahmacharya
Kṣamā (forgiveness)
Dhṛti
Dhyana in Hinduism
Dayā (compassion)
Mitahara
Ārjava
Akrodha, Absence of anger
Dāna (charity)
Sattva

References

Yoga concepts
Hindu philosophical concepts
Jain ethics
Relational ethics
Hindu ethics